Mangifera austro-yunnanensis is a species of plant in the family Anacardiaceae. It is endemic to China.

References

austro-yunnanensis
Endemic flora of China
Data deficient plants
Taxonomy articles created by Polbot
Taxobox binomials not recognized by IUCN